The Bowery Boys are fictional New York City characters, portrayed by a company of New York actors, who were the subject of 48 feature films released by Monogram Pictures and its successor Allied Artists Pictures Corporation from 1946 through 1958.

The Bowery Boys were successors of the East Side Kids, who had been the subject of films since 1940. The group originated as the Dead End Kids, who originally appeared in the 1937 film Dead End.

Origins

The Dead End Kids

The Dead End Kids originally appeared in the 1935 play Dead End, dramatized by Sidney Kingsley. When Samuel Goldwyn turned the play into a 1937 film, he recruited the original "kids" from the play—Leo Gorcey, Huntz Hall, Bobby Jordan, Gabriel Dell, Billy Halop, and Bernard Punsly—to appear in the same roles in the film. This led to the making of six other films that shared the collective title "The Dead End Kids".

The Little Tough Guys

In 1938, Universal launched its own tough-kid series, "Little Tough Guys." Gradually, Universal recruited most of the original Dead End Kids, so the series ultimately featured "The Dead End Kids and Little Tough Guys." Universal made twelve feature films, and three 12-chapter serials with the gang. The final film in Universal's series, Keep 'Em Slugging, was released in 1943, with Bobby Jordan replacing erstwhile ringleader Billy Halop.

The East Side Kids

Independent producer Sam Katzman cashed in on the Dead End Kids' popularity by producing a low-budget imitation, East Side Kids (1940) with six juvenile actors, including Hally Chester who had appeared with individual Dead Enders in various films, and former Our Gang kid Donald Haines. The film was released by Monogram Pictures. When Bobby Jordan and Leo Gorcey became available in 1940, Katzman signed them and "The East Side Kids" became a Monogram series. Katzman also signed Leo's brother David Gorcey and "Sunshine Sammy" Morrison, another Our Gang alumnus. Original Dead End Kids Huntz Hall and Gabriel Dell followed Jordan and Gorcey to Monogram, as did freelance juvenile Billy Benedict of the Little Tough Guys.

The original Dead End Kids were now working at several studios, so the East Side Kids were made at the same time that Universal was making the "Dead End Kids and Little Tough Guys" series. A total of 22 East Side Kids films were made, with the final one, Come Out Fighting, released in 1945.

The Bowery Boys

In 1945, when East Side Kids producer Katzman refused to grant Leo Gorcey's request to double his weekly salary, Gorcey quit the series, which then ended immediately. Bobby Jordan then suggested a meeting with his agent, Jan Grippo. Grippo, Gorcey, and Hall formed Jan Grippo Productions, revamped the format, and rechristened the series The Bowery Boys. (The earlier films' credits appear as "Leo Gorcey and The Bowery Boys".) Gorcey, who owned 40 percent of the company, starred, produced, and contributed to the scripts. The new series followed a more established formula than the prior incarnations of the team, with the gang usually hanging out at Louie's Sweet Shop (at 3rd & Canal St.) until an adventure came along.

The original main characters were Terrence Aloysius "Slip" Mahoney (Leo Gorcey), Horace Debussy "Sach" Jones (Huntz Hall), Bobby (Bobby Jordan), Whitey (Billy Benedict), and Chuck (David Gorcey, sometimes billed as David Condon). In 1948 Bobby was replaced by Butch Williams, with former East Side Kids Bennie Bartlett and Buddy Gorman alternating in the role. The proprietor of the malt shop where they hung out was the panicky Louie Dumbrowski (Bernard Gorcey, Leo's and David's real-life father).

Like the previous incarnations of the team, the members went through a number of changes over the course of the series. Thirteen actors were members of the team at one time or another. Ernie "Sunshine Sammy" Morrison, "Scruno" in the East Side Kids films, declined an invitation to rejoin the gang. (He later stated in an interview that he "didn't like the setup," possibly referring to the idea of Gorcey and Hall being in the forefront, and being paid much more than the other members.) Bobby Jordan was also unhappy with the direction of the series, which favored Gorcey and Hall and limited the participation of the other gang members. He left the series after being injured in an elevator accident.

Gabriel Dell returned in the fourth entry, Spook Busters (1946), as "Gabe Moreno," a former member of the gang just out of the Navy with a French war bride in tow. He remained (minus spouse) for the next 16 features. Gabe was a convenient "utility" character, frequently changing jobs (attorney, policeman, song plugger, reporter, television personality) to suit the story at hand—and the limited casting budget. Dell often acted as a bridge between the real world and the Bowery gang he would summon to assist him. He reprised one of his East Side Kids roles in Hard Boiled Mahoney (1947), playing a myopic nerd with thick glasses, ascot, and cap. His final appearance was in Blues Busters in 1950, generally regarded as one of the funniest in the series.

The early films such as In Fast Company (1946) flirted with the same humor-laced crime drama of the previous series, but they gradually shifted to situation comedy (western comedy, prison comedy, military comedy, college comedy, hillbilly comedy, etc.). In 1953 a new producer, Ben Schwalb, hired director Edward Bernds and writer Elwood Ullman, both closely associated with The Three Stooges. The situation-comedy content immediately gave way to all-out slapstick, in the Three Stooges manner using many of the Stooges' gags, and the stories became more juvenile. The new approach literally paid off: "The Bowery Boys Meet the Monsters was the best moneymaker of all of them," Bernds told historian Ted Okuda in 1987. "Actually, every Bowery Boys picture made money. Even if it was a bad one, it didn't lose. The Bowery Boys Meet the Monsters stood out above the others in terms of profit." Bernds left the series after Dig That Uranium (1956), although an unused Bernds-Ullman script was filmed later as Looking for Danger (1957).

The budgets of the series had been lowering gradually. Productions that had formerly been filmed in 10 or 11 days (a speedy schedule to begin with) were now being filmed in five or six days. Cheaper films meant cheaper talent: the Monogram films had featured impressive casts of "name" supporting actors, but by the mid-1950s the studio would hire only one or two veteran featured players per film (Eric Blore, Lyle Talbot, Addison Richards, Barton MacLane, Fritz Feld, Mary Beth Hughes, Byron Foulger, Paul Cavanagh, etc.) and fill out the cast with lesser-known actors. 

Gorcey had been drinking heavily during the filming of Dig That Uranium (1955), according to Edward Bernds. After filming was completed, Bernard Gorcey was killed in an automobile accident, devastating his son Leo whose drinking became even heavier. It visibly affected his performance in the following film, Crashing Las Vegas (1956). During filming, he became violently unhinged, trashing the set and destroying every prop in sight. At a subsequent meeting with Allied Artists executives, Gorcey demanded an increase on the 40% interest he held in the series. This was denied, and after a heated exchange, he stormed off the studio lot. Gorcey claimed to have quit, but Edward Bernds offered an opinion from behind the scenes: "He was even worse on Crashing Las Vegas than he was on Dig That Uranium, and I believe Ben [Schwalb] went to [studio executive] Walter Mirisch and said, 'It won't work; he's impossible and if we're going to continue this series we've got to do it with somebody else'... No, Leo was fired -- he drank too much and he couldn't do his work anymore."

The studio owed exhibitors three more films for the 1956 season, so Gorcey was replaced by Stanley Clements, a former tough-teen actor who had been in a few East Side Kids movies. Clements, as "Duke Coveleskie," adapted to the series easily and completed the three films, which now starred "Huntz Hall and The Bowery Boys." With Louie absent, the gang's new hangout was a rooming house, where they helped landlady Kate Kelly (played first by Doris Kemper, then by Queenie Smith). The new Hall-Clements partnership was successful enough to be renewed for the 1957 season. Four more films were made, with Eddie LeRoy joining the cast as bespectacled "Blinky." The gang returned to the sweet shop, now known as Clancy's Cafe, with its similarly put-upon proprietor Mike Clancy (played first by Percy Helton, then by Dick Elliott).

Transition from theaters to television

The series ended suddenly in September 1957. Producer Ben Schwalb moved on to other projects at Allied Artists, but Huntz Hall still had two films left on his contract. Former film editor and now staff producer Richard Heermance was assigned to oversee these last two films, Up in Smoke and In the Money, and William Beaudine -- who had been the Bowery Boys' most frequent director -- came back to conclude the series. The studio then demolished the long-standing "Bowery street" on the studio backlot, replacing it with a western street.

There was still a demand for the Bowery Boys comedies -- they were useful fillers on double-feature programs and kiddie matinées, and drive-ins used them extensively. Allied Artists had been offering a backlog of Bowery Boys titles all along, reminding exhibitors that older titles were still available from local exchanges. After the series concluded with In the Money, Allied Artists began a formal reissue program, continuing to release the films seasonally. The first of the reissues was Blues Busters (1950), which returned to theaters in 1958. Theaters continued to play Bowery Boys features well into the 1960s.

Allied Artists was planning to syndicate The Bowery Boys to television. Jan Grippo, who had produced the series from 1946 to 1951, still held a 50-percent interest in his 23 productions, so Allied Artists bought the rights from Grippo in December 1957. The transaction was front-page news in the trade, and the amount was reported as "more than $500,000." Preparing the series for television required making new negatives for 16mm film prints, and then making a complete set of 48 new prints for each local market. With so many films in the series, this took time. The Bowery Boys finally entered TV syndication in 1960. The films became a staple for independent stations across America, often used to fill the early-afternoon time slots on weekends, much as the same films played at matinées in theaters.

The Bowery Boys (48 titles) was third-longest feature-film series of American origin in motion-picture history (behind the Charles Starrett westerns at 131 titles, and Hopalong Cassidy at 66). The final Bowery Boys film, In the Money, was released in 1958. Only Huntz Hall and David Gorcey had remained with the series since 1946.

List of the Bowery Boys

Other recurring players

Filmography

Home media
In 2012, all 48 Bowery Boys films were made available as a set of manufactured-on-demand DVDs by Warner Brothers under its Archive Collection label in four volumes, each consisting of 12 films on four recordable media discs. Initial distribution was advertised by Warner Bros. as being traditionally replicated on "pressed disc" media in anticipation of high demand for the films to be "remastered from the best available elements."

References

Further reading
 Hollywood's Made-to-Order Punks: The Dead End Kids, Little Tough Guys, East Side Kids and the Bowery Boys by Richard Roat, Mendi Koenig and Brandy Gorcey-Ziesemer, BearManor Media (2009)

External links

Film characters introduced in 1946
Film series introduced in 1946
American male comedians
American film series
Comedy film series
Fictional characters from New York City
Comedians from New York City